Omar Mahmoud Khalef (born 11 April 1990) is an Iraqi football striker who plays for Al-Gharafa in Qatar. He is the younger brother of Younis Mahmoud.

External links

Living people
1990 births
Iraqi footballers
Qatari footballers
Al-Gharafa SC players
Al-Khor SC players
Qatar Stars League players
Association football forwards